Rita Keszthelyi (born 10 December 1991) is a Hungarian water polo player. At the 2012, 2016 and 2020 Summer Olympics, she competed for the Hungary women's national water polo team in the women's tournament.

See also
 Hungary women's Olympic water polo team records and statistics
 List of women's Olympic water polo tournament top goalscorers
 List of World Aquatics Championships medalists in water polo

References

External links
 

1991 births
Living people
Sportspeople from Budapest
Hungarian female water polo players
Water polo players at the 2012 Summer Olympics
Water polo players at the 2016 Summer Olympics
Water polo players at the 2020 Summer Olympics
World Aquatics Championships medalists in water polo
Medalists at the 2020 Summer Olympics
Olympic bronze medalists for Hungary in water polo
21st-century Hungarian women